Identity Unknown is the title of two films:

Identity Unknown (1945 film), an American film starring Richard Arlen as a soldier with amnesia
Identity Unknown (1960 film), a British drama featuring Richard Wyler and Pauline Yate